Counting Rod Numerals is a Unicode block containing traditional Chinese counting rod symbols, which mathematicians used for calculation in ancient China, Japan, Korea, and Vietnam. The orientation of the Unicode characters follows Song dynasty convention, with digits represented as horizontal lines, and tens represented as vertical lines, which differs from Han dynasty practice which represented digits as vertical lines, and tens as horizontal lines.

The block also contains five ideographic tally marks, based on the five strokes of the character 正, which are widely used in East Asia. There are also two characters for use in representing traditional European tally marks (only Tally Mark One and Tally Mark Five are encoded, with tally numbers two through four intended to be represented as a sequence of two through four Tally Mark One characters).

Block

History
The following Unicode-related documents record the purpose and process of defining specific characters in the Counting Rod Numerals block:

See also 
Numerals in Unicode

References 

Unicode blocks